The 2005 Big East Conference baseball tournament was held at Commerce Bank Ballpark in Bridgewater, New Jersey. This was the twenty first annual Big East Conference baseball tournament and last to be held at Commerce Bank Ballpark. The  won their fourth tournament championship in a row and claimed the Big East Conference's automatic bid to the 2005 NCAA Division I baseball tournament. Notre Dame would go on to win five championships in a row.

Format and seeding 
The Big East baseball tournament was a 4 team double elimination tournament in 2005. The top four regular season finishers were seeded one through four based on conference winning percentage only.

Tournament

Jack Kaiser Award 
Matt Edwards was the winner of the 2005 Jack Kaiser Award. Edwards was a senior first baseman for the Notre Dame Fighting Irish.

References 

Tournament
Big East Conference Baseball Tournament
Big East Conference baseball tournament
Big East Conference baseball tournament
Baseball in New Jersey
Bridgewater Township, New Jersey
College sports in New Jersey
Sports competitions in New Jersey
Sports in Somerset County, New Jersey
Tourist attractions in Somerset County, New Jersey